Wild Honey or Wildhoney may refer to:

Film and theatre
 Wild Honey (play), a 1984 play by Michael Frayn
 Wild Honey (1918 film), a silent film Western
 Wild Honey (1922 film), a silent film
 Wild Honey, a 1942 Barney Bear cartoon

Music 
 Wild Honey (band), an Australian rock band
 Wild Honey, a late-1970s American girl group featuring Freddi Poole
 Wild Honey, a 1970s American band formed by Ron Townson

Albums 
 Wild Honey (album), an album by the Beach Boys
 Wildhoney (Tiamat album)
 Birrkuta – Wild Honey, an album by Yothu Yindi

Songs
 "Wild Honey" (The Beach Boys song)
 "Wild Honey" (U2 song)
 "Wild Honey", a song by Dr. John from City Lights
 "Wild Honey", a 2013 cover by Hugh Laurie from Didn't It Rain
 "Wild Honey", a 1980 song by Van Morrison from Common One

Literature
Wild Honey, 1964 collection of poetry by Alistair Te Ariki Campbell
Wild Honey, 1982 novel by Fern Michaels
'Wild Honey from Various Thyme, 1908 collection of poetry by Michael Field
Wild Honey, a 2006 young adult novel in the series The Phantom Stallion by Terri Farley

See also
 Bitter Honey (disambiguation)
 Honey (disambiguation)
 Wild at Honey, an album by Guitar Vader
 "Wild Honey Pie", by the Beatles